Rudhauli is one of four tehsils in Basti district, Uttar Pradesh, in the Rudhauli Vidhan Sabha constituency and Basti Lok Sabha constituency, containing 284 villages. Samajwadi Party candidate Rajendra Prasad Chaudhary is MLA since 2022.

Demographics
As of the 2011 India census, Rudhauli Tehsil has 31,067 households, and a population of 206,030, of which 102,940 are men and 103,090 are women. Children between the age of 0 and 6 make up 17.49% (36,036) of the total population. 

The sex ratio of Rudhauli Tehsil is around 1001 men to 912 women, average for Uttar Pradesh state. The literacy rate of Rudhauli Tehsil is 54.11%; 63.18% of males and 45.06% of females are literate. The entire population lives in urban areas.

Politics
Rudhauli is a constituency of the Uttar Pradesh Legislative Assembly covering the city of Rudhauli in the Basti district of Uttar Pradesh, India.
In 2022 UP Constituency election was elected from Rudhauli . According to the Association for Democratic Reforms; rajendra Prasad Chaudhary  is the poorest MLA among all the MLA from Basti.

References

External links 

 रुधौली श्रीराम मंदिर निर्माण में एक लाख के आर्थिक सहयोग से निधि संग्रह अभियान का शुभारम्भ
 Basti’s Richest MLA :बस्ती में सबसे अमीर विधायक अजय सिंह और सबसे गरीब संजय जायसवाल

Tehsils of Uttar Pradesh
Basti district